Robert Scorer (5 October 1898–1971) was an English footballer who played in the Football League for Bristol Rovers, Crewe Alexandra, Hull City and Wigan Borough.

References

1898 births
1971 deaths
English footballers
Association football midfielders
English Football League players
Hull City A.F.C. players
Bristol Rovers F.C. players
Wigan Borough F.C. players
Crewe Alexandra F.C. players
Shrewsbury Town F.C. players